Daniel "Sailor" Tshabalala (born 6 October 1977 in Sebokeng, Gauteng) is a retired South African football defender.

Tshabalala played for Platinum Stars, FC AK and Orlando Pirates. He made four appearances for the South African squad and was part of the 2006 African Nations Cup squad.

External links

1977 births
Living people
People from Sebokeng
South African soccer players
South Africa international soccer players
2006 Africa Cup of Nations players
Association football defenders
Orlando Pirates F.C. players
Platinum Stars F.C. players
F.C. AK players
Soccer players from Gauteng